Fres Oquendo (born April 1, 1973) is a Puerto Rican professional heavyweight boxer. He had a successful amateur record before turning professional in 1997. He has challenged three times for world heavyweight titles.

Amateur career
He had an amateur record of 105-5:

1990: 178 lb. Springfield Golden Gloves Champion
1992: 178 lb. Chicago City Golden Glove Champion
1993: Chicago City Golden Glove 201 lb.+ Super Heavyweight Champion
1993: National Golden Gloves Heavyweight Champion
1995: Chicago City Golden Glove 201 lb.+ Super Heavyweight Champion

Professional career
Known as "Fast Fres" and "The Big O", Oquendo won his first 22 professional bouts, including impressive victories over Duncan Dokiwari, Bert Cooper, Clifford Etienne, David Izon, and Obed Sullivan.  In 2002, while at his peak, Oquendo took on David Tua.  Oquendo controlled the fight until the 9th round when Tua caught him with a series of heavy blows causing the fight to be stopped. Oquendo was noticeably unsteady on his feet after the stoppage and had to hold the top rope to stay upright.

In 2003, Oquendo came from behind to KO Maurice Harris in the 10th, setting up a shot at IBF heavyweight title holder Chris Byrd. In a close fight, Byrd won a decision to keep his IBF belt. In 2004, Oquendo got another shot at a belt against WBA heavyweight title holder John Ruiz, losing by TKO in round 11. Oquendo then took 2 years off for surgery to repair a torn lab-rum, returning early 2006. Quick wins against Brazilian champ Daniel Bispo and then Javier Mora set up a fight against Evander Holyfield, which Holyfield won by unanimous decision on November 10, 2006 at the Alamodome in San Antonio, Texas. He almost called off the fight as suggested by the UCLA Medical Center due to tonsillitis and strep-throat but decided to fight anyway. He again gained the WBC-WBO Latino belt in 2007, after defeating Dominique Alexander then following it up with a win against Cuban Elisier Castillo. In a grueling ESPN bout in Miami, Florida Oquendo out lasted Castillo. In late 2008, Oquendo lost a fight to James Toney on December 13, by split decision. He was deducted a point in the 8th round for a questionable rabbit punch, and the fight was labeled the robbery of the year. Oquendo was seen as winning by Versus viewers and by all press row. Versus analysts 115-113 & 116-112 respectively and compubox numbers had overwhelmingly favored Oquendo.

Oquendo fought Bruce Seldon on July 24, 2009 in a Regional Title bout which was officiated by fellow Carl Schurz High School Graduate, Alma Mater, World Class referee Pete Podgorski.  Oquendo defeated Seldon by knockout in the 9th round in a bout which Seldon took a knee in round 8 and in round 9 was knocked down and counted out. In 2010 Oquendo became only the 2nd man in 35 Pro fights to stop Demetrice King and gain the USBA & NABA titles. He then fought former champion Jean-Marc Mormeck and lost in a fight that Dan Rafael called candidate for "robbery of the year". Oquendo then fought former heavyweight champion Oliver McCall in another split decision loss in December 2010.

In 2011, Oquendo has remained dormant choosing to help prepare former WBA champion David Haye at the World Famous Angelo Dundee's 5th St. Gym, where he himself trains, then fly to Austria to help WBC champion Vitali Klitschko prepare for his victory over Tomasz Adamek in Poland. As of June 2011, Fres had more rounds boxed as a Heavyweight than any of the 3 Heavyweight Champions and all of the top 10 Heavyweights in all 4 major governing bodies and is the only heavyweight in history to hold the USBA, NABA, NABF, WBC, WBA & WBO Latino belts. He is a 2 time World title Challenger and has been ranked as high as number 3 in Ring Magazine.

In 2012, Oquendo made his return to the ring with a 2nd round DQ, (originally scored a TKO) against World Record holder Travis Fulton. Oquendo broke Fulton's nose in the 1st
round and preceded to land un-answered punches. In round 2, although Fulton was game, Oquendo proved too much for the experienced boxer. An MMA takedown of Oquendo and excessive holding Fulton finally succumbed to Oquendo's arsenal. It was all over when the Ref waved it off. Fulton thanked Oquendo for the opportunity. Oquendo had two consecutive win in 2012, one against Joey Abell to win the WBA Fedelatin Championship via TKO and followed up by a stoppage of veteran Robert Hawkins. Oquendo broke his hand in the 3rd round, yet still managed to stop the tough and durable Hawkins. Oquendo fought June 8, 2013 to defend his WBA Fedelatin and also fight for the NABA and WBC US Silver belt. 

In a tough fight against a durable Derric Rossy, Oquendo slipped and tore his meniscus in round 3 and fought 7 rounds with little movement. The fight was close as Rossy seemed to take Oquendo's best shots and give back as much. When the decision came in Oquendo got the nod in a fight he had to show heart fighting injured. He began training and expected to have a great 2014 hopefully fighting for the WBA World Championship, the WBC World Championship or the WBC World Cup Tournament where he would represent his division and country.

On May 10, 2014, Oquendo fought Galen Brown. Oquendo won via a second-round TKO. On June 7, 2014, Oquendo fought former champion Ruslan Chagaev, for the vacant WBA regular world heavyweight title. Chagaev was the more aggressive fighter in the first four rounds of the fight. The remainder of the fight saw both boxers having their ups and downs. In the end, two of the judges saw Chagaev as the winner by a slim margin, both scoring it 115-113, while the third judge had it 114-114, ultimately leading to a majority-decision win for Chagaev.

In September 2018, Oquendo was slated to fight Manuel Charr for the WBA heavyweight title, but the fight was called off after Charr tested positive for a banned substance.

Professional boxing record

|-
|align="center" colspan=8|37 Wins (24 knockouts), 8 Losses, 0 Draws 
|-
| align="center" style="border-style: none none solid solid; background: #e3e3e3"|Result
| align="center" style="border-style: none none solid solid; background: #e3e3e3"|Record
| align="center" style="border-style: none none solid solid; background: #e3e3e3"|Opponent
| align="center" style="border-style: none none solid solid; background: #e3e3e3"|Type
| align="center" style="border-style: none none solid solid; background: #e3e3e3"|Round
| align="center" style="border-style: none none solid solid; background: #e3e3e3"|Date
| align="center" style="border-style: none none solid solid; background: #e3e3e3"|Location
| align="center" style="border-style: none none solid solid; background: #e3e3e3"|Notes
|-align=center
|Loss
|37–8
|align=left| Ruslan Chagaev
|MD
|12
|07/06/2014
|align=left| Grozny, Russia
|align=left|
|-align=center
|Win
|37–7
|align=left| Galen Brown
|TKO
|2 
|10/05/2014
|align=left| Memorial Hall, Kansas City, Kansas, United States
|align=left|
|-align=center
|Win
|36–7
|align=left| Derric Rossy
|UD
|10
|08/06/2013
|align=left| Horseshoe Casino, Hammond, Indiana, United States
|align=left|
|-align=center
|Win
|35–7
|align=left| Robert Hawkins
|RTD
|7 
|18/08/2012
|align=left| Horseshoe Casino, Hammond, Indiana, United States
|align=left|
|-align=center
|Win
|34–7
|align=left| Joey Abell
|TKO
|9 
|25/05/2012
|align=left| Horseshoe Casino, Hammond, Indiana, United States
|align=left|
|-align=center
|Win
|33–7
|align=left| Travis Fulton
|DQ
|2 
|03/03/2012
|align=left| Dance Land Ballroom, Davenport, Iowa, United States
|align=left|
|-align=center
|Loss
|32–7
|align=left| Oliver McCall
|SD
|12
|07/12/2010
|align=left| Seminole Hard Rock Hotel & Casino Hollywood, Hollywood, Florida, United States
|align=left|
|-align=center
|Loss
|32–6
|align=left| Jean-Marc Mormeck
|UD
|12
|06/05/2010
|align=left| Halle Georges Carpentier, Paris, France
|align=left|
|-align=center
|Win
|32–5
|align=left| Demetrice King
|RTD
|9 
|20/02/2010
|align=left| Horseshoe Hammond, Hammond, Indiana, United States
|align=left|
|-align=center
|Win
|31–5
|align=left| Bruce Seldon
|KO
|9 
|24/07/2009
|align=left| UIC Pavilion, Chicago, Illinois, United States
|align=left| Referee:Pete Podgorski 
|-align=center
|Win
|30–5
|align=left| Mark Brown
|TKO
|3 
|26/06/2009
|align=left| UIC Pavilion, Chicago, Illinois, United States
|align=left|
|-align=center
|Loss
|29–5
|align=left| James Toney
|SD
|12
|13/12/2008
|align=left| Morongo Casino Resort & Spa, Cabazon, California, United States
|align=left|
|-align=center
|Win
|29–4
|align=left| Dominique Alexander
|KO
|3 
|18/07/2008
|align=left| Buffalo Bill's Star Arena, Primm, Nevada, United States
|align=left|
|-align=center
|Win
|28–4
|align=left| Elieser Castillo
|UD
|10
|20/07/2007
|align=left| Mahi Temple Shrine Auditorium, Miami, Florida, United States
|align=left|
|-align=center
|Win
|27–4
|align=left| Damian Norris
|TKO
|6 
|02/05/2007
|align=left| Mahi Temple Shrine Auditorium, Miami, Florida, United States
|align=left|
|-align=center
|Loss
|26–4
|align=left| Evander Holyfield
|UD
|12
|10/11/2006
|align=left| Alamodome, San Antonio, Texas, United States
|align=left|
|-align=center
|Win
|26–3
|align=left| Javier Mora
|UD
|10
|25/05/2006
|align=left| Pechanga Resort & Casino, Temecula, California, United States
|align=left|
|-align=center
|Win
|25–3
|align=left| Daniel Bispo
|TKO
|9 
|16/02/2006
|align=left| Grand Ballroom, New York, New York, United States
|align=left|
|-align=center
|Loss
|24–3
|align=left| John Ruiz
|TKO
|11 
|17/04/2004
|align=left| Madison Square Garden, New York, New York, United States
|align=left|
|-align=center
|Loss
|24–2
|align=left| Chris Byrd
|UD
|12
|20/09/2003
|align=left| Mohegan Sun Casino, Uncasville, Connecticut, United States
|align=left|
|-align=center
|Win
|24–1
|align=left| Maurice Harris
|KO
|10 
|01/03/2003
|align=left| Thomas & Mack Center, Las Vegas, Nevada, United States
|align=left|
|-align=center
|Win
|23–1
|align=left| George Arias
|TKO
|11 
|14/12/2002
|align=left| Boardwalk Hall, Atlantic City, New Jersey, United States
|align=left|
|-align=center
|Loss
|22–1
|align=left| David Tua
|TKO
|9 
|13/04/2002
|align=left| Mountaineer Casino Racetrack and Resort, Chester, West Virginia, United States
|align=left|
|-align=center
|Win
|22–0
|align=left| David Izon
|TKO
|3 
|01/12/2001
|align=left| Jacob Javits CenterNew York, New York, United States
|align=left|
|-align=center
|Win
|21–0
|align=left| Obed Sullivan
|TKO
|11 
|02/09/2001
|align=left| Silverstar Hotel & Casino Choctaw, Mississippi, United States
|align=left|
|-align=center
|Win
|20–0
|align=left| Clifford Etienne
|TKO
|8 
|23/03/2001
|align=left| Texas Station Casino Las Vegas, Nevada, United States
|align=left|
|-align=center
|Win
|19–0
|align=left| Willie Chapman
|KO
|4 
|10/12/2000
|align=left| Grand Victoria Casino Elgin, Illinois, United States
|align=left|
|-align=center
|Win
|18–0
|align=left| Ramon Garbey
|UD
|10
|25/06/2000
|align=left| Grand Victoria Casino Elgin, Illinois, United States
|align=left|
|-align=center
|Win
|17–0
|align=left| Dale Crowe
|UD
|10
|06/02/2000
|align=left| Grand Victoria Casino Elgin, Illinois, United States
|align=left|
|-align=center
|Win
|16–0
|align=left| Bert Cooper
|UD
|10
|16/10/1999
|align=left| Star Plaza Theater Merrillville, Indiana, United States
|align=left|
|-align=center
|Win
|15–0
|align=left| Phil Jackson
|UD
|10
|12/09/1999
|align=left| Harrah's Casino Kansas City, Missouri, United States
|align=left|
|-align=center
|Win
|14–0
|align=left| Craig Payne
|TKO
|3 
|10/07/1999
|align=left| Grand Victoria Casino Elgin, Illinois, United States
|align=left|
|-align=center
|Win
|13–0
|align=left| Bradley Rone
|TKO
|6 
|27/03/1999
|align=left| Genesis Center Gary, Indiana, United States
|align=left|
|-align=center
|Win
|12–0
|align=left| Everett Martin
|UD
|6
|20/03/1999
|align=left| New Frontier Hotel Las Vegas, Nevada, United States
|align=left|
|-align=center
|Win
|11–0
|align=left| Duncan Dokiwari
|UD
|6
|16/01/1999
|align=left| MGM Grand Las Vegas, Nevada, United States
|align=left|
|-align=center
|Win
|10–0
|align=left| Louis Monaco
|PTS
|6
|11/12/1998
|align=left| Pueblo, Colorado, United States
|align=left|
|-align=center
|Win
|9–0
|align=left| Bruce Douglas
|TKO
|1 
|13/11/1998
|align=left| Miccosukee Indian Gaming Resort, Miami, Florida, United States
|align=left|
|-align=center
|Win
|8–0
|align=left| Wesley Martin
|TKO
|1 
|04/09/1998
|align=left| Miccosukee Indian Gaming Resort, Miami, Florida, United States
|align=left|
|-align=center
|Win
|7–0
|align=left| Val Smith
|TKO
|2 
|12/06/1998
|align=left| Belle of Baton Rouge Casino, Baton Rouge, Louisiana, United States
|align=left|
|-align=center
|Win
|6–0
|align=left| Richie Brown
|MD
|4
|27/03/1998
|align=left| Trump Marina Hotel Casino, Atlantic City, New Jersey, United States
|align=left|
|-align=center
|Win
|5–0
|align=left| Rahman Green
|KO
|4 
|27/03/1998
|align=left| Trump Marina Hotel Casino, Atlantic City, New Jersey, United States
|align=left|
|-align=center
|Win
|4–0
|align=left| Sam Williams
|TKO
|3 
|13/12/1997
|align=left| Concord Plaza Expo Center, Northlake, Illinois, United States
|align=left|
|-align=center
|Win
|3–0
|align=left| Jessie Henry
|TKO
|4 
|14/11/1997
|align=left| South Padre Island, Texas, United States
|align=left|
|-align=center
|Win
|2–0
|align=left| Val Smith
|UD
|4
|07/06/1997
|align=left| Hawthorne Race Course, Cicero, Illinois, United States
|align=left|
|-align=center
|Win
|1–0
|align=left| Mark Johnson
|TKO
|4
|10/05/1997
|align=left| Hawthorne Race Course, Moline, Illinois, United States
|align=left|
|-align=center

References

Sources
 
Fres Oquendo - Profile, News Archive & Current Rankings at Box.Live

1973 births
Living people
Puerto Rican boxers
Heavyweight boxers
National Golden Gloves champions